This generational list of Intel processors attempts to present all of Intel's processors from the pioneering 4-bit 4004 (1971) to the present high-end offerings. Concise technical data is given for each product.

Latest

13th generation Core

Desktop (codenamed "Raptor Lake")

12th generation Core

Desktop (codenamed "Alder Lake")

Mobile (codenamed "Alder Lake")

11th generation Core

Desktop (codenamed "Rocket Lake")

Mobile (codenamed "Tiger Lake")

10th generation Core

Desktop (codenamed "Comet Lake")

Mobile (codenamed "Comet Lake", "Ice Lake", and "Amber Lake")

9th generation Core

Desktop (codenamed "Coffee Lake Refresh")

8th generation Core

Desktop (codenamed "Coffee Lake")

Mobile (codenamed "Coffee Lake", "Amber Lake" and "Whiskey Lake")

7th generation Core

Desktop (codenamed "Kaby Lake" and "Skylake-X")

Mobile (codenamed "Kaby Lake" and "Apollo Lake")

All processors
All processors are listed in chronological order.

The 4-bit processors

Intel 4004 
First microprocessor (single-chip IC processor)

 Introduced November 15, 1971
 Clock rate 740 kHz

 0.07 MIPS
 Bus width: 4 bits (multiplexed address/data due to limited pins)
 PMOS
 2,300 transistors at 10 μm
 Addressable memory 640 bytes
 Program memory 4 KB (4096 B)
 Originally designed to be used in Busicom calculator
MCS-4 family:
 4004 – CPU
 4001 – ROM & 4-bit Port
 4002 – RAM & 4-bit Port
 4003 – 10-bit Shift Register
 4008 – Memory+I/O Interface
 4009 – Memory+I/O Interface
 4211 – General Purpose Byte I/O Port
 4265 – Programmable General Purpose I/O Device
 4269 – Programmable Keyboard Display Device
 4289 – Standard Memory Interface for MCS-4/40
 4308 – 8192-bit (1024 × 8) ROM w/ 4-bit I/O Ports
 4316 – 16384-bit (2048 × 8) Static ROM
 4702 – 2048-bit (256 × 8) EPROM
 4801 – 5.185 MHz Clock Generator Crystal for 4004/4201A or 4040/4201A

Intel 4040 
 Introduced in 1974 by Intel
 Clock speed was 740 kHz (same as the 4004 microprocessor)
 3,000 transistors
 Interrupt features were available
 Programmable memory size: 8 KB (8192 B)
 640 bytes of data memory
 24-pin DIP

The 8-bit processors

8008
 Introduced April 1, 1972
 Clock rate 500 kHz (8008-1: 800 kHz)
 0.05 MIPS
 Bus width: 8 bits (multiplexed address/data due to limited pins)
 Enhancement load PMOS logic
 3,500 transistors at 10 μm
 Addressable memory 16 KB
 Typical in early 8-bit microcomputers, dumb terminals, general calculators, bottling machines
 Developed in tandem with 4004
 Originally intended for use in the Datapoint 2200 microcomputer
 Key volume deployment in Texas Instruments 742 microcomputer in >3,000 Ford dealerships

8080
 Introduced April 1, 1974
 Clock rate 2 MHz (very rare 8080B: 3 MHz)
 0.29 MIPS
 Data bus width: 8 bits, address bus: 16 bits
 Enhancement load NMOS logic
 4,500 transistors at 6 μm
 Assembly language downward compatible with 8008
 Addressable memory 64 KB (64 × 1024 B)
 Up to 10× the performance of the 8008
 Used in e.g. the Altair 8800, traffic light controller, cruise missile
 Required six support chips versus 20 for the 8008

8085
 Introduced March 1976
 Clock rate 3 MHz
 0.37 MIPS
 Data bus width: 8 bits, address bus: 16 bits
 Depletion load NMOS logic
 6,500 transistors at 3 μm
 Binary compatible downward with the 8080
 Used in Toledo scales. Also used as a computer peripheral controller – modems, hard disks, printers, etc.
 CMOS 80C85 in Mars Sojourner, Radio Shack Model 100 portable

Microcontrollers
They are ICs with CPU, RAM, ROM (or PROM or EPROM), I/O Ports, Timers & Interrupts

Intel 8048
 Single accumulator Harvard architecture

MCS-48 family:
 Intel 8020 – Single-Component 8-bit Microcontroller, 1 KB ROM, 64 Byte RAM, 13 I/O ports
 Intel 8021 – Single-Component 8-bit Microcontroller, 1 KB ROM, 64 Byte RAM, 21 I/O ports
 Intel 8022 – Single-Component 8-bit Microcontroller, With On-Chip A/D Converter
 Intel 8035 – Single-Component 8-bit Microcontroller, 64 Byte RAM
 Intel 8039 – Single-Component 8-bit Microcontroller, 128 Byte RAM
 Intel 8040 – Single-Component 8-bit Microcontroller, 256 Byte RAM
 Intel 8048 – Single-Component 8-bit Microcontroller, 1 KB ROM, 64 byte RAM, 27 I/O ports, 0.73 MIPS @ 11 MHz 
 Intel 8049 – Single-Component 8-bit Microcontroller, 2 KB ROM, 128 byte RAM, 27 I/O ports, 
 Intel 8050 – Single-Component 8-bit Microcontroller, 4 KB ROM, 256 byte RAM, 27 I/O ports, 
 Intel 8748 – Single-Component 8-bit Microcontroller, 1 KB EPROM, 64 byte RAM, 27 I/O ports, 
 Intel 8749 – Single-Component 8-bit Microcontroller, 2 KB EPROM, 128 byte RAM, 27 I/O ports, 
 Intel 87P50 – Single-Component 8-bit Microcontroller, ext. ROM socket (2758/2716/2732), 256 byte RAM, 27 I/O ports
 Intel 8648 – Single-Component 8-bit Microcontroller, 1 KB OTP EPROM, 64 byte RAM, 27 I/O ports
 Intel 8041 – Universal Peripheral Interface 8-bit Slave Microcontroller, 1 KB ROM, 64 byte RAM
 Intel 8041AH – Universal Peripheral Interface 8-bit Slave Microcontroller, 1 KB ROM, 128 byte RAM
 Intel 8641 – Universal Peripheral Interface 8-bit Slave Microcontroller ?
 Intel 8741 – Universal Peripheral Interface 8-bit Slave Microcontroller, 1 KB EPROM, 64 byte RAM
 Intel 8741AH – Universal Peripheral Interface 8-bit Slave Microcontroller, 1 KB EPROM, 128 byte RAM
 Intel 8042 – Universal Peripheral Interface 8-bit Slave Microcontroller, 2 KB ROM, 256 byte RAM
 Intel 8742 – Universal Peripheral Interface 8-bit Slave Microcontroller, 2 KB EPROM, 128 byte RAM
 Intel 8742AH – Universal Peripheral Interface 8-bit Slave Microcontroller, 2 KB OTP EPROM, 256 byte RAM
 Intel 8243 – Input/Output Expander.  The available 28-pin PLCC version in sampling for first quarter of 1986.
 Intel 8244 – General Purpose Graphics Display Device (ASIC NTSC/SECAM)
 Intel 8245 – General Purpose Graphics Display Device (ASIC PAL)

Intel 8051
 Single accumulator Harvard architecture

MCS-51 family:
 8031 – 8-bit Control-Oriented Microcontroller
 8032 – 8-bit Control-Oriented Microcontroller
 8044 – High Performance 8-bit Microcontroller
 8344 – High Performance 8-bit Microcontroller
 8744 – High Performance 8-bit Microcontroller
 8051 – 8-bit Control-Oriented Microcontroller
 8052 – 8-bit Control-Oriented Microcontroller
 8054 – 8-bit Control-Oriented Microcontroller
 8058 – 8-bit Control-Oriented Microcontroller
 8351 – 8-bit Control-Oriented Microcontroller
 8352 – 8-bit Control-Oriented Microcontroller
 8354 – 8-bit Control-Oriented Microcontroller
 8358 – 8-bit Control-Oriented Microcontroller
 8751 – 8-bit Control-Oriented Microcontroller
 8752 – 8-bit Control-Oriented Microcontroller
 8754 – 8-bit Control-Oriented Microcontroller
 8758 – 8-bit Control-Oriented Microcontroller

Intel 80151
 Single accumulator Harvard architecture

MCS-151 family:
 80151 – High Performance 8-bit Control-Oriented Microcontroller
 83151 – High Performance 8-bit Control-Oriented Microcontroller
 87151 – High Performance 8-bit Control-Oriented Microcontroller
 80152 – High Performance 8-bit Control-Oriented Microcontroller
 83152 – High Performance 8-bit Control-Oriented Microcontroller

Intel 80251
 Single accumulator Harvard architecture

MCS-251 family:
 80251 – 8/16/32-bit Microcontroller
 80252 – 8/16/32-bit Microcontroller
 80452 – 8/16/32-bit Microcontroller
 83251 – 8/16/32-bit Microcontroller
 87251 – 8/16/32-bit Microcontroller
 87253 – 8/16/32-bit Microcontroller

MCS-96 family
 8061 – 16-bit Microcontroller (parent of MCS-96 family ROMless With A/D, most sold to Ford) 
 8094 – 16-bit Microcontroller (48-Pin ROMLess Without A/D)
 8095 – 16-bit Microcontroller (48-Pin ROMLess With A/D)
 8096 – 16-bit Microcontroller (68-Pin ROMLess Without A/D)
 8097 – 16-bit Microcontroller (68-Pin ROMLess With A/D)
 8394 – 16-bit Microcontroller (48-Pin With ROM Without A/D)
 8395 – 16-bit Microcontroller (48-Pin With ROM With A/D)
 8396 – 16-bit Microcontroller (68-Pin With ROM Without A/D)
 8397 – 16-bit Microcontroller (68-Pin With ROM With A/D)
 8794 – 16-bit Microcontroller (48-Pin With EROM Without A/D)
 8795 – 16-bit Microcontroller (48-Pin With EROM With A/D)
 8796 – 16-bit Microcontroller (68-Pin With EROM Without A/D)
 8797 – 16-bit Microcontroller (68-Pin With EROM With A/D)
 8098 – 16-bit Microcontroller
 8398 – 16-bit Microcontroller
 8798 – 16-bit Microcontroller
 80196 – 16-bit Microcontroller
 83196 – 16-bit Microcontroller
 87196 – 16-bit Microcontroller
 80296 – 16-bit Microcontroller

The bit-slice processor

3000 family

Introduced in the third quarter of 1974, these bit-slicing components used bipolar Schottky transistors. Each component implemented two bits of a processor function; packages could be interconnected to build a processor with any desired word length. 
Members of the family:

 3001 – Microcontrol Unit
 3002 – 2-bit Arithmetic Logic Unit slice
 3003 – Look-ahead Carry Generator
 3205 – High-performance 1 of 8 Binary Decoder
 3207 – Quad Bipolar-to-MOS Level Shifter and Driver
 3208 – Hex Sense Amp and Latch for MOS Memories
 3210 – TTL-to-MOS Level Shifter and High Voltage Clock Driver
 3211 – ECL-to-MOS Level Shifter and High Voltage Clock Driver
 3212 – Multimode Latch Buffer
 3214 – Interrupt Control Unit
 3216 – Parallel, Inverting Bi-Directional Bus Driver
 3222 – Refresh Controller for 4K (4096 B) NMOS DRAMs
 3226 – Parallel, Inverting Bi-Directional Bus Driver
 3232 – Address Multiplexer and Refresh Counter for 4K DRAMs
 3242 – Address Multiplexer and Refresh Counter for 16K (16 × 1024 B) DRAMs
 3245 – Quad Bipolar TTL-to-MOS Level Shifter and Driver for 4K
 3246 – Quad Bipolar ECL-to-MOS Level Shifter and Driver for 4K
 3404 – High-performance 6-bit Latch
 3408 – Hex Sense Amp and Latch for MOS Memories
 3505 – Next generation processor

Bus width 2n bits data/address (depending on number n of slices used)

The 16-bit processors: MCS-86 family

8086
 Introduced June 8, 1978
 Clock rates:
 5 MHz, 0.33 MIPS
 8 MHz, 0.66 MIPS
 10 MHz, 0.75 MIPS
 The memory is divided into odd and even banks. It accesses both banks concurrently to read 16 bits of data in one clock cycle
 Data bus width: 16 bits, address bus: 20 bits
 29,000 transistors at 3 μm
 Addressable memory 1 megabyte (1024B)
 Up to 10× the performance of 8080
 First used in the Compaq Deskpro IBM PC-compatible computers. Later used in portable computing, and in the IBM PS/2 Model 25 and Model 30. Also used in the AT&T PC6300 / Olivetti M24, a popular IBM PC-compatible (predating the IBM PS/2 line)
 Used segment registers to access more than 64 KB of data at once, which many programmers complained made their work excessively difficult.
 The first x86 CPU
 Later renamed the iAPX 86

8088
 Introduced June 1, 1979
 Clock rates:
 4.77 MHz, 0.33 MIPS
 8 MHz, 0.66 MIPS
 16-bit internal architecture
 External data bus width: 8 bits, address bus: 20 bits
 29,000 transistors at 3 μm
 Addressable memory 1 megabyte
 Identical to 8086 except for its 8-bit external bus (hence an 8 instead of a 6 at the end); identical Execution Unit (EU), different Bus Interface Unit (BIU)
 Used in IBM PC and PC-XT and compatibles
 Later renamed the iAPX 88

80186
 Introduced 1982
 Clock rates
 6 MHz, > 1 MIPS
 55,000 transistors
 Included two timers, a DMA controller, and an interrupt controller on the chip in addition to the processor (these were at fixed addresses which differed from the IBM PC, although it was used by several PC compatible vendors such as Australian company Cleveland)
 Added a few opcodes and exceptions to the 8086 design, otherwise identical instruction set to 8086 and 8088
 BOUND, ENTER, LEAVE
 INS, OUTS
 IMUL imm, PUSH imm, PUSHA, POPA
 RCL/RCR/ROL/ROR/SHL/SHR/SAL/SAR reg, imm
 Address calculation and shift operations are faster than 8086
 Used mostly in embedded applications – controllers, point-of-sale systems, terminals, and the like
 Used in several non-PC compatible DOS computers including RM Nimbus, Tandy 2000, and CP/M 86 Televideo PM16 server
 Later renamed to iAPX 186

80188
 A version of the 80186 with an 8-bit external data bus
 Later renamed the iAPX 188

80286
 Introduced February 2, 1982
 Clock rates:
 6 MHz, 0.9 MIPS
 8 MHz, 10 MHz, 1.5 MIPS
 12.5 MHz, 2.66 MIPS
 16 MHz, 20 MHz and 25 MHz available.
 Data bus width: 16 bits, address bus: 24 bits
 Included memory protection hardware to support multitasking operating systems with per-process address space.
 134,000 transistors at 1.5 μm
 Addressable memory 16 MB
 Added protected-mode features to 8086 with essentially the same instruction set
 3–6× the performance of the 8086
 Widely used in IBM PC AT and AT clones contemporary to it

32-bit processors: the non-x86 microprocessors

iAPX 432
 Introduced January 1, 1981 as Intel's first 32-bit microprocessor
 Multi-chip CPU
 Object/capability architecture
 Microcoded operating system primitives
 One terabyte virtual address space
 Hardware support for fault tolerance
 Two-chip General Data Processor (GDP), consists of 43201 and 43202
 43203 Interface Processor (IP) interfaces to I/O subsystem
 43204 Bus Interface Unit (BIU) simplifies building multiprocessor systems
 43205 Memory Control Unit (MCU)
 Architecture and execution unit internal data base paths: 32 bits
 Clock rates:
 5 MHz
 7 MHz
 8 MHz

i960 a.k.a. 80960
 Introduced April 5, 1988
 RISC-like 32-bit architecture
 Predominantly used in embedded systems
 Evolved from the capability processor developed for the BiiN joint venture with Siemens
 Many variants identified by two-letter suffixes

i860 a.k.a. 80860
 Introduced February 26, 1989
 RISC 32/64-bit architecture, with floating point pipeline characteristics very visible to programmer
 Used in the Intel iPSC/860 Hypercube parallel supercomputer
 Mid-life kicker in the i870 processor (primarily a speed bump, some refinement/extension of instruction set)
 Used in the Intel Delta massively parallel supercomputer prototype, emplaced at California Institute of Technology
 Used in the Intel Paragon massively parallel supercomputer, emplaced at Sandia National Laboratory

XScale
 Introduced August 23, 2000
 32-bit RISC microprocessor based on the ARM architecture
 Many variants, such as the PXA2xx applications processors, IOP3xx I/O processors and IXP2xxx and IXP4xx network processors

32-bit processors: the 80386 range

80386DX 
 Introduced October 17, 1985
 Clock rates:
 16 MHz, 5 MIPS
 20 MHz, 6 to 7 MIPS, introduced February 16, 1987
 25 MHz, 7.5 MIPS, introduced April 4, 1988
 33 MHz, 9.9 MIPS (9.4 SPECint92 on Compaq/i 16 KB L2), introduced April 10, 1989
 Data bus width: 32 bits, address bus: 32 bits
 275,000 transistors at 1 μm
 Addressable memory 4 GB (4 × 1024 B)
 Virtual memory  64 TB (64 × 1024 B)
 First x86 chip to handle 32-bit data sets
 Reworked and expanded memory protection support including paged virtual memory and virtual-86 mode, features required at the time by Xenix and Unix. This memory capability spurred the development and availability of OS/2 and is a fundamental requirement for modern operating systems like Linux, Windows, and macOS
 First used by Compaq in the Deskpro 386. Used in desktop computing
 Unlike the DX naming convention of the 486 chips, it had no math co-processor
 Later renamed Intel386 DX

80386SX
 Introduced June 16, 1988
 Clock rates:
 16 MHz, 2.5 MIPS
 20 MHz, 3.1 MIPS, introduced January 25, 1989
 25 MHz, 3.9 MIPS, introduced January 25, 1989
 33 MHz, 5.1 MIPS, introduced October 26, 1992
 32-bit internal architecture
 External data bus width: 16 bits
 External address bus width: 24 bits
 275,000 transistors at 1 μm
 Addressable memory 16 MB
 Virtual memory 64 TB
 Narrower buses enable low-cost 32-bit processing
 Used in entry-level desktop and portable computing
 No math co-processor
 No commercial software used protected mode or virtual storage for many years
 Later renamed Intel386 SX

80376

 Introduced January 16, 1989; discontinued June 15, 2001
 Variant of 386SX intended for embedded systems
 No "real mode", starts up directly in "protected mode"
 Replaced by much more successful 80386EX from 1994

80386SL
 Introduced October 15, 1990
 Clock rates:
 20 MHz, 4.21 MIPS
 25 MHz, 5.3 MIPS, introduced September 30, 1991
 32-bit internal architecture
 External bus width: 16 bits
 855,000 transistors at 1 μm
 Addressable memory 4 GB
 Virtual memory 64 TB
 First chip specifically made for portable computers because of low power consumption of chip
 Highly integrated, includes cache, bus, and memory controllers

80386EX
 Introduced August 1994
 Variant of 80386SX intended for embedded systems
 Static core (i.e. may run as slowly (and thus, power efficiently) as desired) down to full halt
 On-chip peripherals:
 Clock and power management
 Timers/counters
 Watchdog timer
 Serial I/O units (sync and async) and parallel I/O
 DMA
 RAM refresh
 JTAG test logic
 Significantly more successful than the 80376
 Used aboard several orbiting satellites and microsatellites
 Used in NASA's FlightLinux project

32-bit processors: the 80486 range

80486DX
 Introduced April 10, 1989
 Clock rates:
 25 MHz, 20 MIPS (16.8 SPECint92, 7.40 SPECfp92)
 33 MHz, 27 MIPS (22.4 SPECint92 on Micronics M4P 128 KB L2), introduced May 7, 1990
 50 MHz, 41 MIPS (33.4 SPECint92, 14.5 SPECfp92 on Compaq/50L 256 KB L2), introduced June 24, 1991
 Bus width: 32 bits
 1.2 million transistors at 1 μm; the 50 MHz was at 0.8 μm
 Addressable memory 4 GB
 Virtual memory 64 TB
 Level 1 cache of 8 KB on chip
 Math coprocessor on chip
 50× performance of the 8088
 Officially named Intel486 DX
 Used in desktop computing and servers
 Family 4 model 1

80486SX
 Introduced April 22, 1991
 Clock rates:
 16 MHz, 13 MIPS
 20 MHz, 16.5 MIPS, introduced September 16, 1991
 25 MHz, 20 MIPS (12 SPECint92), introduced September 16, 1991
 33 MHz, 27 MIPS (15.86 SPECint92), introduced September 21, 1992
 Bus width: 32 bits
 1.185 million transistors at 1 μm and 900,000 at 0.8 μm
 Addressable memory 4 GB
 Virtual memory 64 TB
 Identical in design to 486DX but without a math coprocessor. The first version was an 80486DX with disabled math coprocessor in the chip and different pin configuration. If the user needed math coprocessor capabilities, he must add 487SX which was actually a 486DX with different pin configuration to prevent the user from installing a 486DX instead of 487SX, so with this configuration 486SX+487SX you had 2 identical CPU's with only 1 effectively turned on
 Officially named Intel486 SX
 Used in low-cost entry to 486 CPU desktop computing, as well as extensively in low cost mobile computing
 Upgradable with the Intel OverDrive processor
 Family 4 model 2

80486DX2
 Introduced March 3, 1992
 Runs at twice the speed of the external bus (FSB)
 Fits in Socket 3
 Clock rates:
 40 MHz
 50 MHz, 41 MIPS
 66 MHz, 54 MIPS
 Officially named Intel486 DX2
 Family 4 model 3

80486SL
 Introduced November 9, 1992
 Clock rates:
 20 MHz, 15.4 MIPS
 25 MHz, 19 MIPS
 33 MHz, 25 MIPS
 Bus width: 32 bits
 1.4 million transistors at 0.8 μm
 Addressable memory 4 GB
 Virtual memory 64 TB
 Officially named Intel486 SL
 Used in notebook computers
 Family 4 model 4

80486DX4
 Introduced March 7, 1994
 Clock rates:
 75 MHz, 53 MIPS (41.3 SPECint92, 20.1 SPECfp92 on Micronics M4P 256 KB L2)
 100 MHz, 70.7 MIPS (54.59 SPECint92, 26.91 SPECfp92 on Micronics M4P 256 KB L2)
 1.6 million transistors at 0.6 μm
 Bus width: 32 bits
 Addressable memory 4 GB
 Virtual memory 64 TB
 Socket 3 168-pin PGA Package, or 208 sq. ftP package
 Officially named Intel486 DX4
 Used in high performance entry-level desktops and value notebooks
 Family 4 model 8

32-bit processors: P5 microarchitecture

Original Pentium
 Bus width: 64 bits
 System bus clock rate 60 or 66 MHz
 Address bus: 32 bits
 Addressable memory 4 GB
 Virtual memory 64 TB
 Superscalar architecture
 Runs on 3.3 volts (except the very first generation "P5")
 Used in desktops
 8 KB of instruction cache
 8 KB of data cache
 P5 – 0.8 μm process technology
 Introduced March 22, 1993
 3.1 million transistors
 The only Pentium to run on 5 Volts
 Socket 4 273 pin PGA Package
 Package dimensions 2.16 in × 2.16 in
 Family 5 model 1
 Variants
 60 MHz, 100 MIPS (70.4 SPECint92, 55.1 SPECfp92 on Xpress 256 KB L2)
 66 MHz, 112 MIPS (77.9 SPECint92, 63.6 SPECfp92 on Xpress 256 KB L2)
 P54 – 0.6 μm process technology
 Socket 5 296/320-pin PGA package
 3.2 million transistors
 Variants
 75 MHz, 126.5 MIPS (2.31 SPECint95, 2.02 SPECfp95 on Gateway P5 256K L2)
 Introduced October 10, 1994
 90, 100 MHz, 149.8 and 166.3 MIPS respectively (2.74 SPECint95, 2.39 SPECfp95 on Gateway P5 256K L2 and 3.30 SPECint95, 2.59 SPECfp95 on Xpress 1ML2 respectively)
 Introduced March 7, 1994
 P54CQS – 0.35 μm process technology
 Socket 5 296/320 pin PGA package
 3.2 million transistors
 Variants
 120 MHz, 203 MIPS (3.72 SPECint95, 2.81 SPECfp95 on Xpress 1 MB L2)
 Introduced March 27, 1995
P54CS – 0.35 μm process technology
 3.3 million transistors
 90 mm2 die size
 Family 5 model 2
 Variants
 Socket 5 296/320-pin PGA package
 133 MHz, 218.9 MIPS (4.14 SPECint95, 3.12 SPECfp95 on Xpress 1 MB L2)
 Introduced June 12, 1995
 150, 166 MHz, 230 and 247 MIPS respectively
 Introduced January 4, 1996
 Socket 7 296/321-pin PGA package
 200 MHz, 270 MIPS (5.47 SPECint95, 3.68 SPECfp95)
 Introduced June 10, 1996

Pentium with MMX Technology
 P55C – 0.35 μm process technology
 Introduced January 8, 1997
 Intel MMX (instruction set) support
 Socket 7 296/321 pin PGA (pin grid array) package
 16 KB L1 instruction cache
 16 KB data cache
 4.5 million transistors
 System bus clock rate 66 MHz
 Basic P55C is family 5 model 4, mobile are family 5 model 7 and 8
 Variants
 166, 200 MHz introduced January 8, 1997
 233 MHz introduced June 2, 1997
 133 MHz (Mobile)
 166, 266 MHz (Mobile) introduced January 12, 1998
 200, 233 MHz (Mobile) introduced September 8, 1997
 300 MHz (Mobile) introduced January 7, 1999

32-bit processors: P6/Pentium M microarchitecture

Pentium Pro
 Introduced November 1, 1995
 Multichip Module (2 die)
 Precursor to Pentium II and III
 Primarily used in server systems
 Socket 8 processor package (387 pins; Dual SPGA)
 5.5 million transistors
 Family 6 model 1
 0.6 μm process technology
 16 KB L1 cache
 256 KB integrated L2 cache
 60 MHz system bus clock rate
 Variants
 150 MHz
 0.35 μm process technology, (two die, a 0.35 μm CPU with 0.6 μm L2 cache)
 5.5 million transistors
 512 KB or 256 KB integrated L2 cache
 60 or 66 MHz system bus clock rate
 Variants
 150 MHz (60 MHz bus clock rate, 256 KB 0.5 μm cache) introduced November 1, 1995
 166 MHz (66 MHz bus clock rate, 512 KB 0.35 μm cache) introduced November 1, 1995
 180 MHz (60 MHz bus clock rate, 256 KB 0.6 μm cache) introduced November 1, 1995
 200 MHz (66 MHz bus clock rate, 256 KB 0.6 μm cache) introduced November 1, 1995
 200 MHz (66 MHz bus clock rate, 512 KB 0.35 μm cache) introduced November 1, 1995
 200 MHz (66 MHz bus clock rate, 1 MB 0.35 μm cache) introduced August 18, 1997

Pentium II
 Introduced May 7, 1997
 Pentium Pro with MMX and improved 16-bit performance
 242-pin Slot 1 (SEC) processor package
 Voltage identification pins
 7.5 million transistors
 32 KB L1 cache
 512 KB  frequency external L2 cache
 The Performance Enhanced mobile Pentium II (codenamed Dixon) had a full-speed 256 KB L2 cache
 Klamath – 0.35 μm process technology (233, 266, 300 MHz)
 66 MHz system bus clock rate
 Family 6 model 3
 Variants
 233, 266, 300 MHz introduced May 7, 1997
 Deschutes – 0.25 μm process technology (333, 350, 400, 450 MHz)
 Introduced January 26, 1998
 66 MHz system bus clock rate (333 MHz variant), 100 MHz system bus clock rate for all subsequent models
 Family 6 model 5
 Variants
 333 MHz introduced January 26, 1998
 350, 400 MHz introduced April 15, 1998
 450 MHz introduced August 24, 1998
 233, 266 MHz (Mobile) introduced April 2, 1998
 333 MHz Pentium II Overdrive processor for Socket 8 Introduced August 10, 1998
 300 MHz (Mobile) introduced September 9, 1998
 333 MHz (Mobile) introduced January 25, 1999

Celeron (Pentium II-based)
 Covington – 0.25 μm process technology
 Introduced April 15, 1998
 242-pin Slot 1 SEPP (Single Edge Processor Package)
 7.5 million transistors
 66 MHz system bus clock rate
 Slot 1
 32 KB L1 cache
 No L2 cache
 Variants
 266 MHz introduced April 15, 1998
 300 MHz introduced June 9, 1998
 Mendocino – 0.25 μm process technology
 Introduced August 24, 1998
 242-pin Slot 1 SEPP (Single Edge Processor Package), Socket 370 PPGA package
 19 million transistors
 66 MHz system bus clock rate
 Slot 1, Socket 370
 32 KB L1 cache
 128 KB integrated cache
 Family 6 model 6
 Variants
 300, 333 MHz introduced August 24, 1998
 366, 400 MHz introduced January 4, 1999
 433 MHz introduced March 22, 1999
 466 MHz
 500 MHz introduced August 2, 1999
 533 MHz introduced January 4, 2000
 266 MHz (Mobile)
 300 MHz (Mobile)
 333 MHz (Mobile) introduced April 5, 1999
 366 MHz (Mobile)
 400 MHz (Mobile)
 433 MHz (Mobile)
 450 MHz (Mobile) introduced February 14, 2000
 466 MHz (Mobile)
 500 MHz (Mobile) introduced February 14, 2000

Pentium II Xeon (chronological entry)

 Introduced June 29, 1998

Pentium III
 Katmai – 0.25 μm process technology
 Introduced February 26, 1999
 Improved PII (i.e. P6-based core) now including Streaming SIMD Extensions (SSE)
 9.5 million transistors
 512 KB (512 × 1024 B)  bandwidth L2 External cache
 242-pin Slot 1 SECC2 (Single Edge Contact cartridge 2) processor package
 System bus clock rate 100 MHz, 133 MHz (B-models)
 Slot 1
 Family 6 model 7
 Variants
 450, 500 MHz introduced February 26, 1999
 550 MHz introduced May 17, 1999
 600 MHz introduced August 2, 1999
 533, 600 MHz introduced (133 MHz bus clock rate) September 27, 1999
 Coppermine – 0.18 μm process technology
 Introduced October 25, 1999
 28.1 million transistors
 256 KB (512 × 1024 B) Advanced Transfer L2 cache (integrated)
 242-pin Slot-1 SECC2 (Single Edge Contact cartridge 2) processor package, 370-pin FC-PGA (flip-chip pin grid array) package
 System Bus clock rate 100 MHz (E-models), 133 MHz (EB models)
 Slot 1, Socket 370
 Family 6 model 8
 Variants
 500 MHz (100 MHz bus clock rate)
 533 MHz
 550 MHz (100 MHz bus clock rate)
 600 MHz
 600 MHz (100 MHz bus clock rate)
 650 MHz (100 MHz bus clock rate) introduced October 25, 1999
 667 MHz introduced October 25, 1999
 700 MHz (100 MHz bus clock rate) introduced October 25, 1999
 733 MHz introduced October 25, 1999
 750, 800 MHz (100 MHz bus clock rate) introduced December 20, 1999
 850 MHz (100 MHz bus clock rate) introduced March 20, 2000
 866 MHz introduced March 20, 2000
 933 MHz introduced May 24, 2000
 1000 MHz introduced March 8, 2000 (not widely available at time of release)
 1100 MHz
 1133 MHz (first version recalled, later re-released)
 400, 450, 500 MHz (Mobile) introduced October 25, 1999
 600, 650 MHz (Mobile) introduced January 18, 2000
 700 MHz (Mobile) introduced April 24, 2000
 750 MHz (Mobile) introduced June 19, 2000
 800, 850 MHz (Mobile) introduced September 25, 2000
 900, 1000 MHz (Mobile) introduced March 19, 2001
 Tualatin – 0.13 μm process technology
 Introduced July 2001
 28.1 million transistors
 32 KB (32 × 1024 B) L1 cache
 256 KB or 512 KB Advanced Transfer L2 cache (integrated)
 370-pin FC-PGA2 (flip-chip pin grid array) package
 133 MHz system bus clock rate
 Socket 370
 Family 6 model 11
 Variants
 1133 MHz (256 KB L2)
 1133 MHz (512 KB L2)
 1200 MHz
 1266 MHz (512 KB L2)
 1333 MHz
 1400 MHz (512 KB L2)

Pentium II Xeon and Pentium III Xeon
 PII Xeon
 Variants
 400 MHz introduced June 29, 1998
 450 MHz (512 KB L2 cache) introduced October 6, 1998
 450 MHz (1 MB and 2 MB L2 cache) introduced January 5, 1999
 PIII Xeon
 Introduced October 25, 1999
 9.5 million transistors at 0.25 μm or 28 million at 0.18 μm
 L2 cache is 256 KB, 1 MB, or 2 MB Advanced Transfer Cache (Integrated)
 Processor Package Style is Single Edge Contact Cartridge (S.E.C.C.2) or SC330
 System Bus clock rate 133 MHz (256 KB L2 cache) or 100 MHz (1–2 MB L2 cache)
 System Bus width: 64 bits
 Addressable memory: 64 GB
 Used in two-way servers and workstations (256 KB L2) or 4- and 8-way servers (1–2 MB L2)
 Family 6 model 10
 Variants
 500 MHz (0.25 μm process) introduced March 17, 1999
 550 MHz (0.25 μm process) introduced August 23, 1999
 600 MHz (0.18 μm process, 256 KB L2 cache) introduced October 25, 1999
 667 MHz (0.18 μm process, 256 KB L2 cache) introduced October 25, 1999
 733 MHz (0.18 μm process, 256 KB L2 cache) introduced October 25, 1999
 800 MHz (0.18 μm process, 256 KB L2 cache) introduced January 12, 2000
 866 MHz (0.18 μm process, 256 KB L2 cache) introduced April 10, 2000
 933 MHz (0.18 μm process, 256 KB L2 cache)
 1000 MHz (0.18 μm process, 256 KB L2 cache) introduced August 22, 2000
 700 MHz (0.18 μm process, 1–2 MB L2 cache) introduced May 22, 2000

Celeron (Pentium III Coppermine-based)
 Coppermine-128, 0.18 μm process technology
 Introduced March, 2000
 Streaming SIMD Extensions (SSE)
 Socket 370, FC-PGA processor package
 28.1 million transistors
 66 MHz system bus clock rate, 100 MHz system bus clock rate from January 3, 2001
 32 KB L1 cache
 128 KB Advanced Transfer L2 cache
 Family 6 model 8
 Variants
 533 MHz
 566 MHz
 600 MHz
 633, 667, 700 MHz introduced June 26, 2000
 733, 766 MHz introduced November 13, 2000
 800 MHz introduced January 3, 2001
 850 MHz introduced April 9, 2001
 900 MHz introduced July 2, 2001
 950, 1000, 1100 MHz introduced August 31, 2001
 550 MHz (Mobile)
 600, 650 MHz (Mobile) introduced June 19, 2000
 700 MHz (Mobile) introduced September 25, 2000
 750 MHz (Mobile) introduced March 19, 2001
 800 MHz (Mobile)
 850 MHz (Mobile) introduced July 2, 2001
 600 MHz (LV Mobile)
 500 MHz (ULV Mobile) introduced January 30, 2001
 600 MHz (ULV Mobile)

XScale (chronological entry – non-x86 architecture)

 Introduced August 23, 2000

Pentium 4 (not 4EE, 4E, 4F), Itanium, P4-based Xeon, Itanium 2 (chronological entries)

 Introduced April 2000 – July 2002

Pentium III Tualatin-based
 Tualatin – 0.13 μm process technology
 32 KB L1 cache
 512KB Advanced Transfer L2 cache
 133 MHz system bus clock rate
 Socket 370
 Variants
 1.0 GHz
 1.13 GHz
 1.26 GHz
 1.4 GHz

Celeron (Pentium III Tualatin-based)
 Tualatin Celeron – 0.13 μm process technology
 32 KB L1 cache
 256 KB Advanced Transfer L2 cache
 100 MHz system bus clock rate
 Socket 370
 Family 6 model 11
 Variants
 1.0 GHz
 1.1 GHz
 1.2 GHz
 1.3 GHz
 1.4 GHz

Pentium M
 Banias 0.13 μm process technology
 Introduced March 2003
 64 KB L1 cache
 1 MB L2 cache (integrated)
 Based on Pentium III core, with SSE2 SIMD instructions and deeper pipeline
 77 million transistors
 Micro-FCPGA, Micro-FCBGA processor package
 Heart of the Intel mobile Centrino system
 400 MHz Netburst-style system bus
 Family 6 model 9
 Variants
 900 MHz (ultra-low voltage)
 1.0 GHz (ultra-low voltage)
 1.1 GHz (low voltage)
 1.2 GHz (low voltage)
 1.3 GHz
 1.4 GHz
 1.5 GHz
 1.6 GHz
 1.7 GHz
 Dothan 0.09 μm (90 nm) process technology
 Introduced May 2004
 2 MB L2 cache
 140 million transistors
 Revised data prefetch unit
 400 MHz Netburst-style system bus
 21 W TDP
 Family 6 model 13
 Variants
 1.00 GHz (Pentium M 723) (ultra-low voltage, 5 W TDP)
 1.10 GHz (Pentium M 733) (ultra-low voltage, 5 W TDP)
 1.20 GHz (Pentium M 753) (ultra-low voltage, 5 W TDP)
 1.30 GHz (Pentium M 718) (low voltage, 10 W TDP)
 1.40 GHz (Pentium M 738) (low voltage, 10 W TDP)
 1.50 GHz (Pentium M 758) (low voltage, 10 W TDP)
 1.60 GHz (Pentium M 778) (low voltage, 10 W TDP)
 1.40 GHz (Pentium M 710)
 1.50 GHz (Pentium M 715)
 1.60 GHz (Pentium M 725)
 1.70 GHz (Pentium M 735)
 1.80 GHz (Pentium M 745)
 2.00 GHz (Pentium M 755)
 2.10 GHz (Pentium M 765)
 Dothan 533 0.09 μm (90 nm) process technology
 Introduced Q1 2005
 Same as Dothan except with a 533 MHz NetBurst-style system bus and 27 W TDP
 Variants
 1.60 GHz (Pentium M 730)
 1.73 GHz (Pentium M 740)
 1.86 GHz (Pentium M 750)
 2.00 GHz (Pentium M 760)
 2.13 GHz (Pentium M 770)
 2.26 GHz (Pentium M 780)
 Stealey 0.09 μm (90 nm) process technology
 Introduced Q2 2007
 512 KB L2, 3 W TDP
 Variants
 600 MHz (A100)
 800 MHz (A110)

Celeron M
 Banias-512 0.13 μm process technology
 Introduced March 2003
 64 KB L1 cache
 512 KB L2 cache (integrated)
 SSE2 SIMD instructions
 No SpeedStep technology, is not part of the 'Centrino' package
 Family 6 model 9
 Variants
 310, 1.20 GHz
 320, 1.30 GHz
 330, 1.40 GHz
 340, 1.50 GHz
 Dothan-1024 90 nm process technology
 64 KB L1 cache
 1 MB L2 cache (integrated)
 SSE2 SIMD instructions
 No SpeedStep technology, is not part of the 'Centrino' package
 Variants
 350, 1.30 GHz
 350J, 1.30 GHz, with Execute Disable bit
 360, 1.40 GHz
 360J, 1.40 GHz, with Execute Disable bit
 370, 1.50 GHz, with Execute Disable bit
 Family 6, Model 13, Stepping 8
 380, 1.60 GHz, with Execute Disable bit
 390, 1.70 GHz, with Execute Disable bit
 Yonah-1024 65 nm process technology
 64 KB L1 cache
 1 MB L2 cache (integrated)
 SSE3 SIMD instructions, 533 MHz front-side bus, execute-disable bit
 No SpeedStep technology, is not part of the 'Centrino' package
 Variants
 410, 1.46 GHz
 420, 1.60 GHz,
 423, 1.06 GHz (ultra-low voltage)
 430, 1.73 GHz
 440, 1.86 GHz
 443, 1.20 GHz (ultra-low voltage)
 450, 2.00 GHz

Intel Core
 Yonah 0.065 μm (65 nm) process technology
 Introduced January 2006
 533/667 MHz front-side bus
 2 MB (Shared on Duo) L2 cache
 SSE3 SIMD instructions
 31W TDP (T versions)
 Family 6, Model 14
 Variants:
 Intel Core Duo T2700 2.33 GHz
 Intel Core Duo T2600 2.16 GHz
 Intel Core Duo T2500 2 GHz
 Intel Core Duo T2450 2 GHz
 Intel Core Duo T2400 1.83 GHz
 Intel Core Duo T2300 1.66 GHz
 Intel Core Duo T2050 1.6 GHz
 Intel Core Duo T2300e 1.66 GHz
 Intel Core Duo T2080 1.73 GHz
 Intel Core Duo L2500 1.83 GHz (low voltage, 15 W TDP)
 Intel Core Duo L2400 1.66 GHz (low voltage, 15 W TDP)
 Intel Core Duo L2300 1.5 GHz (low voltage, 15 W TDP)
 Intel Core Duo U2500 1.2 GHz (ultra-low voltage, 9 W TDP)
 Intel Core Solo T1350 1.86 GHz (533 FSB)
 Intel Core Solo T1300 1.66 GHz
 Intel Core Solo T1200 1.5 GHz

Dual-Core Xeon LV
 Sossaman 0.065 μm (65 nm) process technology
 Introduced March 2006
 Based on Yonah core, with SSE3 SIMD instructions
 667 MHz frontside bus
 2 MB shared L2 cache
 Variants
 2.0 GHz

32-bit processors: NetBurst microarchitecture

Pentium 4
 0.18 μm process technology (1.40 and 1.50 GHz)
 Introduced November 20, 2000
 L2 cache was 256 KB Advanced Transfer cache (integrated)
 Processor package Style was PGA423, PGA478
 System bus clock rate 400 MHz
 SSE2 SIMD Extensions
 42 million transistors
 Used in desktops and entry-level workstations
 0.18 μm process technology (1.7 GHz)
 Introduced April 23, 2001
 See the 1.4 and 1.5 chips for details
 0.18 μm process technology (1.6 and 1.8 GHz)
 Introduced July 2, 2001
 See 1.4 and 1.5 chips for details
 Core voltage is 1.15 volts in Maximum Performance Mode; 1.05 volts in battery optimized mode
 Power <1 watt in battery optimized mode
 Used in full-size and then light mobile PCs
 0.18 μm process technology Willamette (1.9 and 2.0 GHz)
 Introduced August 27, 2001
 See 1.4 and 1.5 chips for details
 Family 15 model 1
 Pentium 4 (2 GHz, 2.20 GHz)
 Introduced January 7, 2002
 Pentium 4 (2.4 GHz)
 Introduced April 2, 2002
 0.13 μm process technology Northwood A (1.7, 1.8, 1.9, 2, 2.2, 2.4, 2.5, 2.6, 2.8 (OEM), 3.0 (OEM) GHz)
 Improved branch prediction and other microcodes tweaks
 512 KB integrated L2 cache
 55 million transistors
 400 MHz system bus
 Family 15 model 2
 0.13 μm process technology Northwood B (2.26, 2.4, 2.53, 2.66, 2.8, 3.06 GHz)
 533 MHz system bus. (3.06 includes Intel's Hyper-Threading technology)
 0.13 μm process technology Northwood C (2.4, 2.6, 2.8, 3.0, 3.2, 3.4 GHz)
 800 MHz system bus (all versions include Hyper-Threading)
 6500 to 10,000 MIPS

Itanium (chronological entry – new non-x86 architecture)

 Introduced 2001

Xeon (32-bit NetBurst)
 Official designation now Xeon; i.e. not "Pentium 4 Xeon"
 Xeon 1.4, 1.5, 1.7 GHz
 Introduced May 21, 2001
 L2 cache was 256 KB Advanced Transfer cache (integrated)
 Processor package Organic Land Grid Array 603 (OLGA 603)
 System bus clock rate 400 MHz
 SSE2 SIMD Extensions
 Used in high-performance and mid-range dual processor enabled workstations
 Xeon 2.0 GHz and up to 3.6 GHz
 Introduced September 25, 2001

Itanium 2 (chronological entry – new non-x86 architecture)
 Introduced July 2002
 See main entry

Mobile Pentium 4-M
 0.13 μm process technology
 55 million transistors
 512 KB L2 cache
 BUS a 400 MHz
 Supports up to 1 GB of DDR 266 MHz memory
 Supports ACPI 2.0 and APM 1.2 System Power Management
 1.3–1.2 V (SpeedStep)
 Power: 1.2 GHz 20.8 W, 1.6 GHz 30 W, 2.6 GHz 35 W
 Sleep power 5 W (1.2 V)
 Deeper sleep power 2.9 W (1.0 V)
 1.40 GHz – 23 April 2002
 1.50 GHz – 23 April 2002
 1.60 GHz – 4 March 2002
 1.70 GHz – 4 March 2002
 1.80 GHz – 23 April 2002
 1.90 GHz – 24 June 2002
 2.00 GHz – 24 June 2002
 2.20 GHz – 16 September 2002
 2.40 GHz – 14 January 2003
 2.50 GHz – 16 April 2003
 2.60 GHz – 11 June 2003

Pentium 4 EE
 Introduced September 2003
 "Extreme Edition"
 Built from the Xeon's "Gallatin" core, but with 2 MB cache

Pentium 4E
 Introduced February 2004
 Built on 0.09 μm (90 nm) process technology Prescott (2.4 A, 2.8, 2.8 A, 3.0, 3.2, 3.4, 3.6, 3.8 ) 1 MB L2 cache
 533 MHz system bus (2.4A and 2.8A only)
 800 MHz system bus (all other models)
 125 million transistors in 1 MB models
 169 million transistors in 2 MB models
 Hyper-Threading support is only available on CPUs using the 800 MHz system bus.
 The processor's integer instruction pipeline has been increased from 20 stages to 31 stages, which theoretically allows for even greater bandwidth
 7500 to 11,000 MIPS
 LGA 775 versions are in the 5xx series (32-bit) and 5x1 series (with Intel 64)
 The 6xx series has 2 MB L2 cache and Intel 64

64-bit processors: IA-64
 New instruction set, not at all related to x86
 Before the feature was eliminated (Montecito, July 2006) IA-64 processors supported 32-bit x86 in hardware, but slowly (see its 2001 market reception and 2006 architectural changes)

Itanium
 Code name Merced
 Family 7
 Released May 29, 2001
 733 MHz and 800 MHz
 2 MB cache
 All recalled and replaced by Itanium 2

Itanium 2
 Family 0x1F
 Released July 2002
 900 MHz – 1.6 GHz
 McKinley 900 MHz 1.5 MB cache, Model 0x0
 McKinley 1 GHz, 3 MB cache, Model 0x0
 Deerfield 1 GHz, 1.5 MB cache, Model 0x1
 Madison 1.3 GHz, 3 MB cache, Model 0x1
 Madison 1.4 GHz, 4 MB cache, Model 0x1
 Madison 1.5 GHz, 6 MB cache, Model 0x1
 Madison 1.67 GHz, 9 MB cache, Model 0x1
 Hondo 1.4 GHz, 4 MB cache, dual-core MCM, Model 0x1

64-bit processors: Intel 64 – NetBurst microarchitecture
 Intel Extended Memory 64 Technology
 Mostly compatible with AMD's AMD64 architecture
 Introduced Spring 2004, with the Pentium 4F (D0 and later P4 steppings)

Pentium 4F
 Prescott-2M built on 0.09 μm (90 nm) process technology
 2.8–3.8 GHz (model numbers 6x0)
 Introduced February 20, 2005
 Same features as Prescott with the addition of:
 2 MB cache
 Intel 64-bit
 Enhanced Intel SpeedStep Technology (EIST)
 Cedar Mill built on 0.065 μm (65 nm) process technology
 3.0–3.6 GHz (model numbers 6x1)
 Introduced January 16, 2006
 Die shrink of Prescott-2M
 Same features as Prescott-2M
 Family 15 Model 4

Pentium D

 Dual-core microprocessor
 No Hyper-Threading
 800 (4×200) MHz front-side bus
 LGA 775 (Socket T)
 Smithfield (Pentium D) – 90 nm process technology (2.66–3.2 GHz)
 Introduced May 26, 2005
 2.66–3.2 GHz (model numbers 805–840)
 230 million transistors
 1 MB × 2 (non-shared, 2 MB total) L2 cache
 Cache coherency between cores requires communication over the FSB
 Performance increase of 60% over similarly clocked Prescott
 2.66 GHz (533 MHz FSB) Pentium D 805 introduced December 2005
 Contains 2× Prescott dies in one package
 Family 15 Model 4
 Presler (Pentium D) – 65 nm process technology (2.8–3.6 GHz)
 Introduced January 16, 2006
 2.8–3.6 GHz (model numbers 915–960)
 376 million transistors
 2× 2 MB (non-shared, 4 MB total) L2 cache
 Contains 2× Cedar Mill dies in one package
 Variants
 Pentium D 945

Pentium Extreme Edition
 Dual-core microprocessor
 Enabled Hyper-Threading
 800 (4×200) MHz front-side bus
 Smithfield (Pentium Extreme Edition) – 90 nm process technology (3.2 GHz)
 Variants
 Pentium 840 EE – 3.20 GHz (2 × 1 MB L2)
 Presler (Pentium Extreme Edition) – 65 nm process technology (3.46, 3.73)
 2 MB × 2 (non-shared, 4 MB total) L2 cache
 Variants
 Pentium 955 EE – 3.46 GHz, 1066 MHz front-side bus
 Pentium 965 EE – 3.73 GHz, 1066 MHz front-side bus
 Pentium 969 EE – 3.73 GHz, 1066 MHz front-side bus

Xeon (64-bit NetBurst)
 Nocona
 Introduced 2004
 Irwindale
 Introduced 2004
 Cranford
 Introduced April 2005
 MP version of Nocona
 Potomac
 Introduced April 2005
 Cranford with 8 MB of L3 cache
 Paxville DP (2.8 GHz)
 Introduced October 10, 2005
 Dual-core version of Irwindale, with 4 MB of L2 cache (2 MB per core)
 2.8 GHz
 800 MT/s front-side bus
 Paxville MP – 90 nm process (2.67 – 3.0 GHz)
 Introduced November 1, 2005
 Dual-core Xeon 7000 series
 MP-capable version of Paxville DP
 2 MB of L2 cache (1 MB per core) or 4 MB of L2 (2 MB per core)
 667 MT/s FSB or 800 MT/s FSB
 Dempsey – 65 nm process (2.67–3.73 GHz)
 Introduced May 23, 2006
 Dual-core Xeon 5000 series
 MP version of Presler
 667 MT/s or 1066 MT/s FSB
 4 MB of L2 cache (2 MB per core)
 LGA 771 (Socket J).
 Tulsa – 65 nm process (2.5–3.4 GHz)
 Introduced August 29, 2006
 Dual-core Xeon 7100-series
 Improved version of Paxville MP
 667 MT/s or 800 MT/s FSB

64-bit processors: Intel 64 – Core microarchitecture

Xeon (64-bit Core microarchitecture)
 Woodcrest – 65 nm process technology
 Server and Workstation CPU (SMP support for dual CPU system)
 Introduced June 26, 2006
 Intel VT-x, multiple OS support
 EIST (Enhanced Intel SpeedStep Technology) in 5140, 5148LV, 5150, 5160
 Execute Disable Bit
 TXT, enhanced security hardware extensions
 SSSE3 SIMD instructions
 iAMT2 (Intel Active Management Technology), remotely manage computers
 Variants
 Xeon 5160, 3.00 GHz (4 MB L2, 1333 MHz FSB, 80 W)
 Xeon 5150, 2.66 GHz (4 MB L2, 1333 MHz FSB, 65 W)
 Xeon 5140, 2.33 GHz (4 MB L2, 1333 MHz FSB, 65 W)
 Xeon 5130, 2.00 GHz (4 MB L2, 1333 MHz FSB, 65 W)
 Xeon 5120, 1.86 GHz (4 MB L2, 1066 MHz FSB, 65 W)
 Xeon 5110, 1.60 GHz (4 MB L2, 1066 MHz FSB, 65 W)
 Xeon 5148LV, 2.33 GHz (4 MB L2, 1333 MHz FSB, 40 W) (low voltage edition)
 Clovertown – 65 nm process technology
 Server and Workstation CPU (SMP support for dual CPU system)
 Introduced December 13, 2006
 Quad-core
 Intel VT-x, multiple OS support
 EIST (Enhanced Intel SpeedStep Technology) in E5365, L5335
 Execute Disable Bit
 TXT, enhanced security hardware extensions
 SSSE3 SIMD instructions
 iAMT2 (Intel Active Management Technology), remotely manage computers
 Variants
 Xeon X5355, 2.66 GHz (2×4 MB L2, 1333 MHz FSB, 105 W)
 Xeon E5345, 2.33 GHz (2×4 MB L2, 1333 MHz FSB, 80 W)
 Xeon E5335, 2.00 GHz (2×4 MB L2, 1333 MHz FSB, 80 W)
 Xeon E5320, 1.86 GHz (2×4 MB L2, 1066 MHz FSB, 65 W)
 Xeon E5310, 1.60 GHz (2×4 MB L2, 1066 MHz FSB, 65 W)
 Xeon L5320, 1.86 GHz (2×4 MB L2, 1066 MHz FSB, 50 W) (low voltage edition)

Intel Core 2
 Conroe – 65 nm process technology
 Desktop CPU (SMP support restricted to 2 CPUs)
 Two cores on one die
 Introduced July 27, 2006
 SSSE3 SIMD instructions
 291 million transistors
 64 KB of L1 cache per core (32+32 KB 8-way)
 Intel VT-x, multiple OS support
 TXT, enhanced security hardware extensions
 Execute Disable Bit
 EIST (Enhanced Intel SpeedStep Technology)
 iAMT2 (Intel Active Management Technology), remotely manage computers
 Intel Management Engine introduced
 LGA 775
 Variants
 Core 2 Duo E6850, 3.00 GHz (4 MB L2, 1333 MHz FSB)
 Core 2 Duo E6800, 2.93 GHz (4 MB L2, 1066 MHz FSB)
 Core 2 Duo E6750, 2.67 GHz (4 MB L2, 1333 MHz FSB, 65 W)
 Core 2 Duo E6700, 2.67 GHz (4 MB L2, 1066 MHz FSB)
 Core 2 Duo E6600, 2.40 GHz (4 MB L2, 1066 MHz FSB, 65 W)
 Core 2 Duo E6550, 2.33 GHz (4 MB L2, 1333 MHz FSB)
 Core 2 Duo E6420, 2.13 GHz (4 MB L2, 1066 MHz FSB)
 Core 2 Duo E6400, 2.13 GHz (2 MB L2, 1066 MHz FSB)
 Core 2 Duo E6320, 1.86 GHz (4 MB L2, 1066 MHz FSB) Family 6, Model 15, Stepping 6
 Core 2 Duo E6300, 1.86 GHz (2 MB L2, 1066 MHz FSB)
 Conroe XE – 65 nm process technology
 Desktop Extreme Edition CPU (SMP support restricted to 2 CPUs)
 Introduced July 27, 2006
 Same features as Conroe
 LGA 775
 Variants
 Core 2 Extreme X6800 – 2.93 GHz (4 MB L2, 1066 MHz FSB)
 Allendale (Intel Core 2) – 65 nm process technology
 Desktop CPU (SMP support restricted to 2 CPUs)
 Two CPUs on one die
 Introduced January 21, 2007
 SSSE3 SIMD instructions
 167 million transistors
 TXT, enhanced security hardware extensions
 Execute Disable Bit
 EIST (Enhanced Intel SpeedStep Technology)
 iAMT2 (Intel Active Management Technology), remotely manage computers
 LGA 775
 Variants
 Core 2 Duo E4700, 2.60 GHz (2 MB L2, 800 MHz FSB)
 Core 2 Duo E4600, 2.40 GHz (2 MB L2, 800 MHz FSB)
 Core 2 Duo E4500, 2.20 GHz (2 MB L2, 800 MHz FSB)
 Core 2 Duo E4400, 2.00 GHz (2 MB L2, 800 MHz FSB)
 Core 2 Duo E4300, 1.80 GHz (2 MB L2, 800 MHz FSB) Family 6, Model 15, Stepping 2
 Merom – 65 nm process technology
 Mobile CPU (SMP support restricted to 2 CPUs)
 Introduced July 27, 2006
 Family 6, Model 15
 Same features as Conroe
 Socket M / Socket P / 479-ball Micro-FCBGA
 Variants
 Core 2 Extreme X7900 2.80 GHz (4 MB L2, 800 MHz FSB)
 Core 2 Extreme X7800 2.60 GHz (4 MB L2, 800 MHz FSB)
 Core 2 Duo T7800, 2.60 GHz (4 MB L2, 800 MHz FSB) (Santa Rosa platform)
 Core 2 Duo T7700, 2.40 GHz (4 MB L2, 800 MHz FSB)
 Core 2 Duo T7600, 2.33 GHz (4 MB L2, 667 MHz FSB)
 Core 2 Duo T7500, 2.20 GHz (4 MB L2, 800 MHz FSB)
 Core 2 Duo T7400, 2.16 GHz (4 MB L2, 667 MHz FSB)
 Core 2 Duo T7300, 2.00 GHz (4 MB L2, 800 MHz FSB)
 Core 2 Duo T7250, 2.00 GHz (2 MB L2, 800 MHz FSB)
 Core 2 Duo T7200, 2.00 GHz (4 MB L2, 667 MHz FSB)
 Core 2 Duo T7100, 1.80 GHz (2 MB L2, 800 MHz FSB)
 Core 2 Duo T5600, 1.83 GHz (2 MB L2, 667 MHz FSB) Family 6, Model 15, Stepping 6
 Core 2 Duo T5550, 1.83 GHz (2 MB L2, 667 MHz FSB, no VT)
 Core 2 Duo T5500, 1.66 GHz (2 MB L2, 667 MHz FSB, no VT)
 Core 2 Duo T5470, 1.60 GHz (2 MB L2, 800 MHz FSB, no VT) Family 6, Model 15, Stepping 13
 Core 2 Duo T5450, 1.66 GHz (2 MB L2, 667 MHz FSB, no VT)
 Core 2 Duo T5300, 1.73 GHz (2 MB L2, 533 MHz FSB, no VT)
 Core 2 Duo T5270, 1.40 GHz (2 MB L2, 800 MHz FSB, no VT)
 Core 2 Duo T5250, 1.50 GHz (2 MB L2, 667 MHz FSB, no VT)
 Core 2 Duo T5200, 1.60 GHz (2 MB L2, 533 MHz FSB, no VT)
 Core 2 Duo L7700, 1.80 GHz (4 MB L2, 800 MHz FSB) (low voltage) Family 6, Model 15, Stepping 11
 Core 2 Duo L7500, 1.60 GHz (4 MB L2, 800 MHz FSB) (low voltage)
 Core 2 Duo L7400, 1.50 GHz (4 MB L2, 667 MHz FSB) (low voltage)
 Core 2 Duo L7300, 1.40 GHz (4 MB L2, 800 MHz FSB) (low voltage)
 Core 2 Duo L7200, 1.33 GHz (4 MB L2, 667 MHz FSB) (low voltage)
 Core 2 Duo U7700, 1.33 GHz (2 MB L2, 533 MHz FSB) (ultra low voltage)
 Core 2 Duo U7600, 1.20 GHz (2 MB L2, 533 MHz FSB) (ultra low voltage)
 Core 2 Duo U7500, 1.06 GHz (2 MB L2, 533 MHz FSB) (ultra low voltage)
 Core 2 Duo U7100, 1.20 GHz (4 MB L2, 800 MHz FSB) (ultra low voltage) Family 6, Model 15, Stepping 11
 Core 2 Solo U2100, 1.06 GHz (1 MB L2, 533 MHz FSB) (ultra low voltage)
 Core 2 Solo U2200, 1.20 GHz (1 MB L2, 533 MHz FSB) (ultra low voltage)
 Kentsfield – 65 nm process technology
 Two dual-core CPU dies in one package
 Desktop CPU quad-core (SMP support restricted to 4 CPUs)
 Introduced December 13, 2006
 Same features as Conroe but with 4 CPU cores
 586 million transistors
 LGA 775
 Family 6, Model 15, Stepping 11
 Variants
 Core 2 Extreme QX6850, 3 GHz (2×4 MB L2 cache, 1333 MHz FSB)
 Core 2 Extreme QX6800, 2.93 GHz (2×4 MB L2 cache, 1066 MHz FSB) (April 9, 2007)
 Core 2 Extreme QX6700, 2.66 GHz (2×4 MB L2 cache, 1066 MHz FSB) (November 14, 2006)
 Core 2 Quad Q6700, 2.66 GHz (2×4 MB L2 cache, 1066 MHz FSB) (July 22, 2007)
 Core 2 Quad Q6600, 2.40 GHz (2×4 MB L2 cache, 1066 MHz FSB) (January 7, 2007)
 Wolfdale – 45 nm process technology
 Die shrink of Conroe
 Same features as Conroe with the addition of:
 50% more cache, 6 MB as opposed to 4 MB
 Intel Trusted Execution Technology
 SSE4 SIMD instructions
 410 million transistors
 Variants
 Core 2 Duo E8600, 3.33 GHz (6 MB L2, 1333 MHz FSB)
 Core 2 Duo E8500, 3.16 GHz (6 MB L2, 1333 MHz FSB)
 Core 2 Duo E8435, 3.07 GHz (6 MB L2, 1066 MHz FSB)
 Core 2 Duo E8400, 3.00 GHz (6 MB L2, 1333 MHz FSB)
 Core 2 Duo E8335, 2.93 GHz (6 MB L2, 1066 MHz FSB)
 Core 2 Duo E8300, 2.83 GHz (6 MB L2, 1333 MHz FSB)
 Core 2 Duo E8235, 2.80 GHz (6 MB L2, 1066 MHz FSB)
 Core 2 Duo E8200, 2.66 GHz (6 MB L2, 1333 MHz FSB)
 Core 2 Duo E8135, 2.66 GHz (6 MB L2, 1066 MHz FSB)
 Core 2 Duo E8190, 2.66 GHz (6 MB L2, 1333 MHz FSB, no TXT, no VT)
 Wolfdale-3M (Intel Core 2) – 45 nm process technology
 Intel Trusted Execution Technology
 Variants
 Core 2 Duo E7600, 3.06 GHz (3 MB L2, 1066 MHz FSB)
 Core 2 Duo E7500, 2.93 GHz (3 MB L2, 1066 MHz FSB)
 Core 2 Duo E7400, 2.80 GHz (3 MB L2, 1066 MHz FSB)
 Core 2 Duo E7300, 2.66 GHz (3 MB L2, 1066 MHz FSB)
 Core 2 Duo E7200, 2.53 GHz (3 MB L2, 1066 MHz FSB)
 Yorkfield, 45 nm process technology
 Quad-core CPU
 Die shrink of Kentsfield
 Contains 2× Wolfdale dual-core dies in one package
 Same features as Wolfdale
 820 million transistors
 Variants
 Core 2 Extreme QX9770, 3.20 GHz (2×6 MB L2, 1600 MHz FSB)
 Core 2 Extreme QX9650, 3.00 GHz (2×6 MB L2, 1333 MHz FSB)
 Core 2 Quad Q9705, 3.16 GHz (2×3 MB L2, 1333 MHz FSB)
 Core 2 Quad Q9700, 3.16 GHz (2×3 MB L2, 1333 MHz FSB)
 Core 2 Quad Q9650, 3 GHz (2×6 MB L2, 1333 MHz FSB)
 Core 2 Quad Q9550, 2.83 GHz (2×6 MB L2, 1333 MHz FSB, 95 W TDP)
 Core 2 Quad Q9550s, 2.83 GHz (2×6 MB L2, 1333 MHz FSB, 65 W TDP)
 Core 2 Quad Q9450, 2.66 GHz (2×6 MB L2, 1333 MHz FSB, 95 W TDP)
 Core 2 Quad Q9505, 2.83 GHz (2×3 MB L2, 1333 MHz FSB, 95 W TDP)
 Core 2 Quad Q9505s, 2.83 GHz (2×3 MB L2, 1333 MHz FSB, 65 W TDP)
 Core 2 Quad Q9500, 2.83 GHz (2×3 MB L2, 1333 MHz FSB, 95 W TDP, no TXT)
 Core 2 Quad Q9400, 2.66 GHz (2×3 MB L2, 1333 MHz FSB, 95 W TDP)
 Core 2 Quad Q9400s, 2.66 GHz (2×3 MB L2, 1333 MHz FSB, 65 W TDP)
 Core 2 Quad Q9300, 2.50 GHz (2×3 MB L2, 1333 MHz FSB, 95 W TDP)
 Core 2 Quad Q8400, 2.66 GHz (2×2 MB L2, 1333 MHz FSB, 95 W TDP)
 Core 2 Quad Q8400s, 2.66 GHz (2×2 MB L2, 1333 MHz FSB, 65 W TDP)
 Core 2 Quad Q8300, 2.50 GHz (2×2 MB L2, 1333 MHz FSB, 95 W TDP)
 Core 2 Quad Q8300s, 2.50 GHz (2×2 MB L2, 1333 MHz FSB, 65 W TDP)
 Core 2 Quad Q8200, 2.33 GHz (2×2 MB L2, 1333 MHz FSB, 95 W TDP)
 Core 2 Quad Q8200s, 2.33 GHz (2×2 MB L2, 1333 MHz FSB, 65 W TDP)
 Core 2 Quad Q7600, 2.70 GHz (2×1 MB L2, 800 MHz FSB, no SSE4) (no Q7600 listed here)
 Intel Core2 Quad Mobile processor family – 45 nm process technology
 Quad-core CPU
 Variants
 Core 2 Quad Q9100, 2.26 GHz (2×6 MB L2, 1066 MHz FSB, 45 W TDP)
 Core 2 Quad Q9000, 2.00 GHz (2×3 MB L2, 1066 MHz FSB, 45 W TDP)

Pentium Dual-Core
 Allendale (Pentium Dual-Core) – 65 nm process technology
 Desktop CPU (SMP support restricted to 2 CPUs)
 Two cores on one die
 Introduced January 21, 2007
 SSSE3 SIMD instructions
 167 million transistors
 TXT, enhanced security hardware extensions
 Execute Disable Bit
 EIST (Enhanced Intel SpeedStep Technology)
 Variants
 Intel Pentium E2220, 2.40 GHz (1 MB L2, 800 MHz FSB)
 Intel Pentium E2200, 2.20 GHz (1 MB L2, 800 MHz FSB)
 Intel Pentium E2180, 2.00 GHz (1 MB L2, 800 MHz FSB)
 Intel Pentium E2160, 1.80 GHz (1 MB L2, 800 MHz FSB)
 Intel Pentium E2140, 1.60 GHz (1 MB L2, 800 MHz FSB)
 Wolfdale-3M (Pentium Dual-Core) – 45 nm process technology
 Intel Pentium E6800, 3.33 GHz (2 MB L2,1066 MHz FSB)
 Intel Pentium E6700, 3.20 GHz (2 MB L2,1066 MHz FSB)
 Intel Pentium E6600, 3.06 GHz (2 MB L2,1066 MHz FSB)
 Intel Pentium E6500, 2.93 GHz (2 MB L2,1066 MHz FSB)
 Intel Pentium E6300, 2.80 GHz (2 MB L2,1066 MHz FSB)
 Intel Pentium E5800, 3.20 GHz (2 MB L2, 800 MHz FSB)
 Intel Pentium E5700, 3.00 GHz (2 MB L2, 800 MHz FSB)
 Intel Pentium E5500, 2.80 GHz (2 MB L2, 800 MHz FSB)
 Intel Pentium E5400, 2.70 GHz (2 MB L2, 800 MHz FSB)
 Intel Pentium E5300, 2.60 GHz (2 MB L2, 800 MHz FSB)
 Intel Pentium E5200, 2.50 GHz (2 MB L2, 800 MHz FSB)
 Intel Pentium E2210, 2.20 GHz (1 MB L2, 800 MHz FSB)

Celeron (64-bit Core microarchitecture)
 Allendale (Celeron, 64-bit Core microarchitecture) – 65 nm process technology
 Variants
 Intel Celeron E1600, 2.40 GHz (512 KB L2, 800 MHz FSB)
 Intel Celeron E1500, 2.20 GHz (512 KB L2, 800 MHz FSB)
 Intel Celeron E1400, 2.00 GHz (512 KB L2, 800 MHz FSB)
 Intel Celeron E1300, 1.80 GHz (512 KB L2, 800 MHz FSB) (does it exist?)
 Intel Celeron E1200, 1.60 GHz (512 KB L2, 800 MHz FSB)
 Wolfdale-3M (Celeron, 64-bit Core microarchitecture) – 45 nm process technology
 Variants
 Intel Celeron E3500, 2.70 GHz (1 MB L2, 800 MHz FSB)
 Intel Celeron E3400, 2.60 GHz (1 MB L2, 800 MHz FSB)
 Intel Celeron E3300, 2.50 GHz (1 MB L2, 800 MHz FSB)
 Intel Celeron E3200, 2.40 GHz (1 MB L2, 800 MHz FSB)
 Conroe-L (Celeron, 64-bit Core microarchitecture) – 65 nm process technology
 Variants
 Intel Celeron 450, 2.20 GHz (512 KB L2, 800 MHz FSB)
 Intel Celeron 440, 2.00 GHz (512 KB L2, 800 MHz FSB)
 Intel Celeron 430, 1.80 GHz (512 KB L2, 800 MHz FSB)
 Intel Celeron 420, 1.60 GHz (512 KB L2, 800 MHz FSB)
 Intel Celeron 220, 1.20 GHz (512 KB L2, 533 MHz FSB)
 Conroe-CL (Celeron, 64-bit Core microarchitecture) – 65 nm process technology
 LGA 771 package
 Variants
 Intel Celeron 445, 1.87 GHz (512 KB L2, 1066 MHz FSB)

Celeron M (64-bit Core microarchitecture)
 Merom-L 65 nm process technology
 64 KB L1 cache
 1 MB L2 cache (integrated)
 SSE3 SIMD instructions, 533 MHz/667 MHz front-side bus, execute-disable bit, 64-bit
 No SpeedStep technology, is not part of the 'Centrino' package
 Variants
 520, 1.60 GHz
 530, 1.73 GHz
 540, 1.86 GHz
 550, 2.00 GHz
 560, 2.13 GHz
 570, 2.26 GHz
 667 MHz FSB
 575, 2.00 GHz
 585, 2.16 GHz

64-bit processors: Intel 64 – Nehalem microarchitecture

Intel Pentium (Nehalem)
 Clarkdale (Pentium, Nehalem microarchitecture) – 32 nm process technology (manufacturing 7 Jan 2010)
 2 physical cores/2 threads
 32+32 KB L1 cache
 256 KB L2 cache
 3 MB L3 cache
 Introduced January 2010
 Socket 1156 LGA
 2-channel DDR3
 Integrated HD GPU
 Variants
 G6950, 2.8 GHz (no Hyper-Threading)
 G6960, 2.933 GHz (no Hyper-Threading)

Core i3 (1st generation)
 Clarkdale (Core i3 1st generation) – 32 nm process technology
 2 physical cores/4 threads
 32+32 KB L1 cache
 256 KB L2 cache
 4 MB L3 cache
 Introduced on January 7, 2010
 Socket 1156 LGA
 2-channel DDR3
 Integrated HD GPU
 Variants
 530, 2.93 GHz Hyper-Threading
 540, 3.06 GHz Hyper-Threading
 550, 3.2 GHz Hyper-Threading
 560, 3.33 GHz Hyper-Threading

Core i5 (1st generation)
 Lynnfield (Core i5 1st generation) – 45 nm process technology
 4 physical cores/4 threads
 32+32 KB L1 cache
 256 KB L2 cache
 8 MB L3 cache
 Introduced September 8, 2009
 Family 6 Model E (Ext. Model 1E)
 Socket 1156 LGA
 2-channel DDR3
 Variants
 750S, 2.40 GHz/3.20 GHz Turbo Boost
 750, 2.66 GHz/3.20 GHz Turbo Boost
 760, 2.80 GHz/3.33 GHz Turbo Boost
 Clarkdale (Core i5 1st generation) – 32 nm process technology
 2 physical cores/4 threads
 32+32 KB L1 cache
 256 KB L2 cache
 4 MB L3 cache
 Introduced January, 2010
 Socket 1156 LGA
 2-channel DDR3
 Integrated HD GPU
 AES Support
 Variants
 650/655K, 3.2 GHz Hyper-Threading Turbo Boost
 660/661, 3.33 GHz Hyper-Threading Turbo Boost
 670, 3.46 GHz Hyper-Threading Turbo Boost
 680, 3.60 GHz Hyper-Threading Turbo Boost

Core i7 (1st generation)
 Bloomfield (Core i7 1st generation) – 45 nm process technology
 4 physical cores/8 threads
 256 KB L2 cache
 8 MB L3 cache
 Front-side bus replaced with QuickPath up to 6.4 GT/s
 Hyper-Threading is again included. This had previously been removed at the introduction of Core line
 781 million transistors
 Intel Turbo Boost Technology
 TDP 130 W
 Introduced November 17, 2008
 Socket 1366 LGA
 3-channel DDR3
 Variants
 975 (extreme edition), 3.33 GHz/3.60 GHz Turbo Boost
 965 (extreme edition), 3.20 GHz/3.46 GHz Turbo Boost
 960, 3.20 GHz/3.46 GHz Turbo Boost
 950, 3.06 GHz/3.33 GHz Turbo Boost
 940, 2.93 GHz/3.20 GHz Turbo Boost
 930, 2.80 GHz/3.06 GHz Turbo Boost
 920, 2.66 GHz/2.93 GHz Turbo Boost
 Lynnfield (Core i7 1st generation) – 45 nm process technology
 4 physical cores/8 threads
 32+32 KB L1 cache
 256 KB L2 cache
 8 MB L3 cache
 No QuickPath, instead compatible with slower DMI interface
 Hyper-Threading is included
 Introduced September 8, 2009
 Socket 1156 LGA
 2-channel DDR3
 Variants
 880, 3.06 GHz/3.73 GHz Turbo Boost (TDP 95 W)
 870/875K, 2.93 GHz/3.60 GHz Turbo Boost (TDP 95 W)
 870S, 2.67 GHz/3.60 GHz Turbo Boost (TDP 82 W)
 860, 2.80 GHz/3.46 GHz Turbo Boost (TDP 95 W)
 860S, 2.53 GHz/3.46 GHz Turbo Boost (TDP 82 W)

Westmere
 Gulftown, 32 nm process technology
 6 physical cores
 256 KB L2 cache
 12 MB L3 cache
 Front-side bus replaced with QuickPath up to 6.4 GT/s
 Hyper-Threading is included
 Intel Turbo Boost Technology
 Socket 1366 LGA
 TDP 130 W
 Introduced 16 March 2010
 Variants
 990X Extreme Edition, 3.46 GHz/3.73 GHz Turbo Boost
 980X Extreme Edition, 3.33 GHz/3.60 GHz Turbo Boost
 970, 3.20 GHz/3.46 GHz Turbo Boost
 Clarksfield – Intel Core i7 Mobile processor family – 45 nm process technology
 4 physical cores
 Hyper-Threading is included
 Intel Turbo Boost Technology
 Variants
 940XM Extreme Edition, 2.13 GHz/3.33 GHz Turbo Boost (8 MB L3, TDP 55 W)
 920XM Extreme Edition, 2.00 GHz/3.20 GHz Turbo Boost (8 MB L3, TDP 55 W)
 840QM, 1.86 GHz/3.20 GHz Turbo Boost (8 MB L3, TDP 45 W)
 820QM, 1.73 GHz/3.06 GHz Turbo Boost (8 MB L3, TDP 45 W)
 740QM, 1.73 GHz/2.93 GHz Turbo Boost (6 MB L3, TDP 45 W)
 720QM, 1.60 GHz/2.80 GHz Turbo Boost (6 MB L3, TDP 45 W)

Xeon (Nehalem microarchitecture)
 Gainestown – 45 nm process technology
 Same processor dies as Bloomfield
 256 KB L2 cache
 8 MB L3 cache, 4 MB may be disabled
 QuickPath up to 6.4 GT/s
 Hyper-Threading is included in some models
 781 million transistors
 Introduced March 29, 2009
 Variants
 W5590, X5570, X5560, X5550, E5540, E5530, L5530, E5520, L5520, L5518, 4 cores, 8 MB L3 cache, HT
 E5506, L5506, E5504, 4 cores, 4 MB L3 cache, no HT
 L5508, E5502, E5502, 2 cores, 4 MB L3 cache, no HT

64-bit processors: Intel 64 – Sandy Bridge / Ivy Bridge microarchitecture

Celeron (Sandy Bridge/Ivy Bridge microarchitecture)
 Sandy Bridge (Celeron-branded) – 32 nm process technology
 2 physical cores/2 threads (500 series), 1 physical core/1 thread (model G440) or 1 physical core/2 threads (models G460 & G465)
 2 MB L3 cache (500 series), 1 MB (model G440) or 1.5 MB (models G460 & G465)
 Introduced 3rd quarter, 2011
 Socket 1155 LGA
 2-channel DDR3-1066
 400 series has max TDP of 35 W
 500-series variants ending in 'T' have a peak TDP of 35 W; others, 65 W
 Integrated GPU
 All variants have peak GPU turbo frequencies of 1 GHz
 Variants in the 400 series have GPUs running at a base frequency of 650 MHz
 Variants in the 500 series ending in 'T' have GPUs running at a base frequency of 650 MHz; others at 850 MHz
 All variants have 6 GPU execution units
 Variants
 G440, 1.6 GHz
 G460, 1.8 GHz
 G465, 1.9 GHz
 G470, 2.0 GHz
 G530T, 2.0 GHz
 G540T, 2.1 GHz
 G550T, 2.2 GHz
 G530, 2.4 GHz
 G540, 2.5 GHz
 G550, 2.6 GHz
 G555, 2.7 GHz

Pentium (Sandy Bridge/Ivy Bridge microarchitecture)
 Sandy Bridge (Pentium-branded) – 32 nm process technology
 2 physical cores/2 threads
 3 MB L3 cache
 624 million transistors
 Introduced May, 2011
 Socket 1155 LGA
 2-channel DDR3-1333 (800 series) or DDR3-1066 (600 series)
 Variants ending in 'T' have a peak TDP of 35 W, others 65 W
 Integrated GPU (HD 2000)
 All variants have peak GPU turbo frequencies of 1.1 GHz
 Variants ending in 'T' have GPUs running at a base frequency of 650 MHz; others at 850 MHz
 All variants have 6 GPU execution units
 Variants
 G620T, 2.2 GHz
 G630T, 2.3 GHz
 G640T, 2.4 GHz
 G645T, 2.5 GHz
 G860T, 2.6 GHz
 G620, 2.6 GHz
 G622, 2.6 GHz
 G630, 2.7 GHz
 G632, 2.7 GHz
 G640, 2.8 GHz
 G840, 2.8 GHz
 G645, 2.9 GHz
 G850, 2.9 GHz
 G860, 3.0 GHz
 G870, 3.1 GHz
 Ivy Bridge (Pentium-branded) – 22 nm tri-gate transistor process technology
 2 physical cores/2 threads
 32+32 KB (per core) L1 cache
 256 KB (per core) L2 cache
 3 MB L3 cache
 Introduced September, 2012
 Socket 1155 LGA
 2-channel DDR3-1333 for G2000 series
 2-channel DDR3-1600 for G2100 series 
 All variants have GPU base frequencies of 650 MHz and peak GPU turbo frequencies of 1.05 GHz
 Variants ending in 'T' have a peak TDP of 35 W; others, TDP of 55 W
 Variants
 G2020T, 2.5 GHz
 G2030T, 2.6 GHz
 G2100T, 2.6 GHz
 G2120T, 2.7 GHz
 G2010, 2.8 GHz
 G2020, 2.9 GHz
 G2030, 3.0 GHz
 G2120, 3.1 GHz
 G2130, 3.2 GHz
 G2140, 3.3 GHz

Core i3 (2nd and 3rd generation)
 Sandy Bridge (Core i3 2nd generation) – 32 nm process technology
 2 physical cores/4 threads
 32+32 KB (per core) L1 cache
 256 KB (per core) L2 cache
 3 MB L3 cache
 624 million transistors
 Introduced January, 2011
 Socket 1155 LGA
 2-channel DDR3-1333
 Variants ending in 'T' have a peak TDP of 35 W, others 65 W
 Integrated GPU
 All variants have peak GPU turbo frequencies of 1.1 GHz
 Variants ending in 'T' have GPUs running at a base frequency of 650 MHz; others at 850 MHz
 Variants ending in '5' have Intel HD Graphics 3000 (12 execution units); others have Intel HD Graphics 2000 (6 execution units)
 Variants
 i3-2100T, 2.5 GHz
 i3-2120T, 2.6 GHz
 i3-2100, 3.1 GHz
 i3-2102, 3.1 GHz
 i3-2105, 3.1 GHz
 i3-2120, 3.3 GHz
 i3-2125, 3.3 GHz
 i3-2130, 3.4 GHz
 Ivy Bridge (Core i3 3rd generation) – 22 nm tri-gate transistor process technology
 2 physical cores/4 threads
 32+32 KB (per core) L1 cache
 256 KB (per core) L2 cache
 3 MB L3 cache
 Introduced September, 2012
 Socket 1155 LGA
 2-channel DDR3-1600
 Variants ending in '5' have Intel HD Graphics 4000; others have Intel HD Graphics 2500
 All variants have GPU base frequencies of 650 MHz and peak GPU turbo frequencies of 1.05 GHz
 TDP 55 W
 Variants
 i3-3220T, 2.8 GHz
 i3-3240T, 2.9 GHz
 i3-3210, 3.2 GHz
 i3-3220, 3.3 GHz
 i3-3225, 3.3 GHz
 i3-3240, 3.4 GHz
 i3-3250, 3.5 GHz

Core i5 (2nd and 3rd generation)
 Sandy Bridge (Core i5 2nd generation) – 32 nm process technology
 4 physical cores/4 threads (except for i5-2390T which has 2 physical cores/4 threads)
 32+32 KB (per core) L1 cache
 256 KB (per core) L2 cache
 6 MB L3 cache (except for i5-2390T which has 3 MB)
 995 million transistors
 Introduced January, 2011
 Socket 1155 LGA
 2-channel DDR3-1333
 Variants ending in 'S' have a peak TDP of 65 W; others, 95 W except where noted
 Variants ending in 'K' have unlocked multipliers; others cannot be overclocked
 Integrated GPU
 i5-2500T has a peak GPU turbo frequency of 1.25 GHz, others 1.1 GHz
 Variants ending in 'T' have GPUs running at a base frequency of 650 MHz; others at 850 MHz
 Variants ending in '5' or 'K' have Intel HD Graphics 3000 (12 execution units), except i5-2550K which has no GPU; others have Intel HD Graphics 2000 (6 execution units)
 Variants ending in 'P' and the i5-2550K have no GPU
 Variants
 i5-2390T, 2.7 GHz/3.5 GHz Turbo Boost (35 W max. TDP)
 i5-2500T, 2.3 GHz/3.3 GHz Turbo Boost (45 W max. TDP)
 i5-2400S, 2.5 GHz/3.3 GHz Turbo Boost
 i5-2405S, 2.5 GHz/3.3 GHz Turbo Boost
 i5-2500S, 2.7 GHz/3.7 GHz Turbo Boost
 i5-2300, 2.8 GHz/3.1 GHz Turbo Boost
 i5-2310, 2.9 GHz/3.2 GHz Turbo Boost
 i5-2320, 3.0 GHz/3.3 GHz Turbo Boost
 i5-2380P, 3.1 GHz/3.4 GHz Turbo Boost
 i5-2400, 3.1 GHz/3.4 GHz Turbo Boost
 i5-2450P, 3.2 GHz/3.5 GHz Turbo Boost
 i5-2500, 3.3 GHz/3.7 GHz Turbo Boost
 i5-2500K, 3.3 GHz/3.7 GHz Turbo Boost
 i5-2550K, 3.4 GHz/3.8 GHz Turbo Boost
 Ivy Bridge (Core i5 3rd generation) – 22 nm Tri-gate transistor process technology
 4 physical cores/4 threads (except for i5-3470T which has 2 physical cores/4 threads)
 32+32 KB (per core) L1 cache
 256 KB (per core) L2 cache
 6 MB L3 cache (except for i5-3470T which has 3 MB)
 Introduced April, 2012
 Socket 1155 LGA
 2-channel DDR3-1600
 Variants ending in 'S' have a peak TDP of 65 W, Variants ending in 'T' have a peak TDP of 35 or 45 W (see variants); others, 77 W except where noted
 Variants ending in 'K' have unlocked multipliers; others cannot be overclocked
 Variants ending in 'P' have no integrated GPU; others have Intel HD Graphics 2500 or Intel HD Graphics 4000 (i5-3475S and i5-3570K only)
 Variants
 i5-3470T, 2.9 GHz/3.6 GHz max Turbo Boost (35 W TDP)
 i5-3570T, 2.3 GHz/3.3 GHz max Turbo Boost (45 W TDP)
 i5-3330S, 2.7 GHz/3.2 GHz max Turbo Boost
 i5-3450S, 2.8 GHz/3.5 GHz max Turbo Boost
 i5-3470S, 2.9 GHz/3.6 GHz max Turbo Boost
 i5-3475S, 2.9 GHz/3.6 GHz max Turbo Boost
 i5-3550S, 3.0 GHz/3.7 GHz max Turbo Boost
 i5-3570S, 3.1 GHz/3.8 GHz max Turbo Boost
 i5-3330, 3.0 GHz/3.2 GHz max Turbo Boost
 i5-3350P, 3.1 GHz/3.3 GHz max Turbo Boost (69 W TDP)
 i5-3450, 3.1 GHz/3.5 GHz max Turbo Boost
 i5-3470, 3.2 GHz/3.6 GHz max Turbo Boost
 i5-3550, 3.3 GHz/3.7 GHz max Turbo Boost
 i5-3570, 3.4 GHz/3.8 GHz max Turbo Boost
 i5-3570K, 3.4 GHz/3.8 GHz max Turbo Boost

Core i7 (2nd and 3rd generation)
 Sandy Bridge (Core i7 2nd generation) – 32 nm process technology
 4 physical cores/8 threads
 32+32 KB (per core) L1 cache
 256 KB (per core) L2 cache
 8 MB L3 cache
 995 million transistors
 Introduced January, 2011
 Socket 1155 LGA
 2-channel DDR3-1333
 Variants ending in 'S' have a peak TDP of 65 W, others – 95 W
 Variants ending in 'K' have unlocked multipliers; others cannot be overclocked
 Integrated GPU
 All variants have base GPU frequencies of 850 MHz and peak GPU turbo frequencies of 1.35 GHz
 Variants ending in 'K' have Intel HD Graphics 3000 (12 execution units); others have Intel HD Graphics 2000 (6 execution units)
 Variants
 i7-2600S, 2.8 GHz/3.8 GHz Turbo Boost
 i7-2600, 3.4 GHz/3.8 GHz Turbo Boost
 i7-2600K, 3.4 GHz/3.8 GHz Turbo Boost
 i7-2700K, 3.5 GHz/3.9 GHz Turbo Boost
 Sandy Bridge-E (Core i7 3rd generation X-Series) – 32 nm process technology
 Up to 6 physical cores/12 threads depending on model number
 32+32 KB (per core) L1 cache
 256 KB (per core) L2 cache
 Up to 20 MB L3 cache depending on model number
 2.27 billion transistors
 Introduced November, 2011
 Socket 2011 LGA
 4-channel DDR3-1600
 All variants have a peak TDP of 130 W
 No integrated GPU
 Variants (all marketed under "Intel Core X-series processors")
 i7-3820, 3.6 GHz/3.8 GHz Turbo Boost, 4 cores, 10 MB L3 cache
 i7-3930K, 3.2 GHz/3.8 GHz Turbo Boost, 6 cores, 12 MB L3 cache
 i7-3960X, 3.3 GHz/3.9 GHz Turbo Boost, 6 cores, 15 MB L3 cache
 i7-3970X, 3.5 GHz/4.0 GHz Turbo Boost, 6 cores, 15 MB L3 cache
 Ivy Bridge (Core i7 3rd generation) – 22 nm Tri-gate transistor process technology
 4 physical cores/8 threads
 32+32 KB (per core) L1 cache
 256 KB (per core) L2 cache
 8 MB L3 cache
 Introduced April, 2012
 Socket 1155 LGA
 2-channel DDR3-1600
 Variants ending in 'S' have a peak TDP of 65 W, variants ending in 'T' have a peak TDP of 45 W, others – 77 W
 Variants ending in 'K' have unlocked multipliers; others cannot be overclocked
 Integrated GPU Intel HD Graphics 4000
 Variants
 i7-3770T – 2.5 GHz/3.7 GHz Turbo Boost
 i7-3770S – 3.1 GHz/3.9 GHz Turbo Boost
 i7-3770 – 3.4 GHz/3.9 GHz Turbo Boost
 i7-3770K – 3.5 GHz/3.9 GHz Turbo Boost

64-bit processors: Intel 64 – Haswell microarchitecture

Core i3 (4th generation)
 Haswell (Core i3 4th generation) – 22nm process technology

64-bit processors: Intel 64 – Broadwell microarchitecture

Core i3 (5th generation)
 Broadwell (Core i3 5th generation) – 14nm process technology

Core i5 (5th generation)
 Broadwell (Core i5 5th generation) – 14nm process technology
 4 physical cores/4 threads
 4 MB L3 cache
 Introduced Q2'15
 Socket 1150 LGA
 2-channel DDR3L-1333/1600
 Integrated GPU
 Variants
 i5-5575R – 2.80 GHz/3.30 GHz Turbo Boost
 i5-5675C – 3.10 GHz/3.60 GHz Turbo Boost
 i5-5675R – 3.10 GHz/3.60 GHz Turbo Boost

Core i7 (5th generation, Including Core-X Series)
 Broadwell (Core i7 5th generation) – 14nm process technology
 4 physical cores/8 threads
 6 MB L3 cache
 Introduced Q2'15
 Socket 1150 LGA
 2-channel DDR3L-1333/1600
 Integrated GPU
 Variants
 i7-5775C – 3.30 GHz/3.70 GHz Turbo Boost
 i7-5775R – 3.30 GHz/3.80 GHz Turbo Boost
 Broadwell-E – 14nm process technology
 6–10 physical cores/12–20 threads
 15–25 MB L3 cache
 Introduced Q2'16
 Socket 2011-v3 LGA
 4-channel DDR4-2133/2400
 No Integrated GPU
 Variants (all marketed under "Intel Core X-series processors")
 i7-6800K – 3.40 GHz/3.60 GHz Turbo Boost/3.80 GHz Turbo Boost Max Technology 3.0 Frequency 15 MB L3 cache
 i7-6850K – 3.60 GHz/3.80 GHz Turbo Boost/4.00 GHz Turbo Boost Max Technology 3.0 Frequency 15 MB L3 cache
 i7-6900K – 3.20 GHz/3.70 GHz Turbo Boost/4.00 GHz Turbo Boost Max Technology 3.0 Frequency 20 MB L3 cache
 i7-6950X – 3.00 GHz/3.50 GHz Turbo Boost/4.00 GHz Turbo Boost Max Technology 3.0 Frequency 25 MB L3 cache

Other Broadwell CPUs
Not listed (yet) are several Broadwell-based CPU models:
 Server and workstation CPUs
 single-CPU: Pentium D15nn, Xeon D-15nn, Xeon E3-12nn v4, Xeon E5-16nn v4
 dual-CPU: Xeon E5-26nn v4
 quad-CPU: Xeon E5-46nn v4, Xeon E7-48nn v4
 octo-CPU: Xeon E7-88nn v4
 Embedded CPUs
 Core i7-57nnEQ, Core i7-58nnEQ
 Mobile CPUs
 Celeron 32nnU, Celeron 37nnU
 Pentium 38nnU
 Core M-5Ynn
 Core i3-50nnU
 Core i5-5nnnU
 Core i7-55nnU, Core i7-56nnU, Core i7-57nnHQ, Core i7-59nnHQ
Note: this list does not say that all processors that match these patterns are Broadwell-based or fit into this scheme. The model numbers may have suffixes that are not shown here.

64-bit processors: Intel 64 – Skylake microarchitecture

Core i3 (6th generation)
 Skylake (Core i3 6th generation) – 14 nm process technology
 2 physical cores/4 threads
 3–4 MB L3 cache
 Introduced Q3'15
 Socket 1151 LGA
 2-channel DDR3L-1333/1600, DDR4-1866/2133
 Integrated GPU Intel HD Graphics 530 (only i3-6098P have HD Graphics 510)
 Variants
 i3-6098P – 3.60 GHz
 i3-6100T – 3.20 GHz
 i3-6100  – 3.70 GHz
 i3-6300T – 3.30 GHz
 i3-6300  – 3.80 GHz
 i3-6320  – 3.90 GHz

Core i5 (6th generation)
 Skylake (Core i5 6th generation) – 14nm process technology
 4 physical cores/4 threads
 6 MB L3 cache
 Introduced Q3'15
 Socket 1151 LGA
 2-channel DDR3L-1333/1600, DDR4-1866/2133
 Integrated GPU Intel HD Graphics 530
 Variants
 i5-6300HQ – 2.30/3.20 GHz Turbo Boost
i5-6400T – 2.20 GHz/2.80 GHz Turbo Boost
 i5-6400  – 2.70 GHz/3.30 GHz Turbo Boost
 i5-6440hq
 i5-6500T – 2.50 GHz/3.10 GHz Turbo Boost
 i5-6500  – 3.20 GHz/3.60 GHz Turbo Boost
 i5-6600T – 2.70 GHz/3.50 GHz Turbo Boost
 i5-6600  – 3.30 GHz/3.90 GHz Turbo Boost
 i5-6600K – 3.50 GHz/3.90 GHz Turbo Boost

Core i7 (6th generation)
 Skylake (Core i7 6th generation) – 14nm process technology
 4 physical cores/8 threads
 8 MB L3 cache
 Introduced Q3'15
 Socket 1151 LGA
 2-channel DDR3L-1333/1600, DDR4-1866/2133
 Integrated GPU Intel HD Graphics 530
 Variants
 i7-6700T – 2.80 GHz/3.60 GHz Turbo Boost
 i7-6700  – 3.40 GHz/4.00 GHz Turbo Boost
 i7-6700K – 4.00 GHz/4.20 GHz Turbo Boost

Other Skylake processors
Many Skylake-based processors are not yet listed in this section: mobile i3/i5/i7 processors (U, H, and M suffixes), embedded i3/i5/i7 processors (E suffix), certain i7-67nn/i7-68nn/i7-69nn.
Skylake-based "Core X-series" processors (certain i7-78nn and i9-79nn models) can be found under current models.

64-bit processors: Intel 64 (7th generation) – Kaby Lake microarchitecture

64-bit processors: Intel 64 (8th and 9th generation) – Coffee Lake microarchitecture

64-bit processors: Intel 64 – Cannon Lake microarchitecture

64-bit processors: Intel 64 (10th generation) – Ice Lake microarchitecture

64-bit processors: Intel 64 (10th generation) – Comet Lake microarchitecture

64-bit processors: Intel 64 (11th generation) – Tiger Lake microarchitecture

64-bit processors: Intel 64 (12th generation) – Alder Lake microarchitecture

64-bit processors: Intel 64 (13th generation) – Raptor Lake microarchitecture

Intel Tera-Scale
 2007: Teraflops Research Chip, an 80 cores processor prototype.
 2009: Single-chip Cloud Computer, a research microprocessor containing the most Intel Architecture cores ever integrated on a silicon CPU chip: 48.

Intel 805xx product codes
Intel discontinued the use of part numbers such as 80486 in the marketing of mainstream x86-architecture processors with the introduction of the Pentium brand in 1993. However, numerical codes, in the 805xx range, continued to be assigned to these processors for internal and part numbering uses. The following is a list of such product codes in numerical order:

Intel 806xx product codes

Intel 807xx product codes

See also

 List of AMD processors
 List of PowerPC processors
 List of Freescale products
 List of Intel Atom processors
 List of Intel Xeon processors
 List of Intel Itanium processors
 List of Intel Celeron processors
 List of Intel Pentium processors
 List of Intel Pentium Pro processors
 List of Intel Pentium II processors
 List of Intel Pentium III processors
 List of Intel Pentium 4 processors
 List of Intel Pentium D processors
 List of Intel Pentium M processors
 List of Intel Core processors
 List of Intel Core 2 processors
 List of Intel Core M processors
 List of Intel Core i3 processors
 List of Intel Core i5 processors
 List of Intel Core i7 processors
 List of Intel Core i9 processors
 List of Intel CPU microarchitectures
 List of Intel graphics processing units
 List of quantum processors
 Apple silicon

References

External links
 Intel Museum: History of the Microprocessor
 Stealey A100 and A110
 Intel Product Specifications
 Intel Processors and Chipsets by Platform Code Name
Intel Processors information

Intel microprocessors
Intel